The Buëch, Occitan Bueg is a river in southeastern France, a right tributary of the Durance. Its source is in the Dauphiné Alps, near the peak of Grand Ferrand. It flows generally southward for most of its course in the Hautes-Alpes département, and flows into the Durance at Sisteron.

Départements and towns along the Buëch include:
 Drôme: 
 Lus-la-Croix-Haute
 Hautes-Alpes:
 Aspres-sur-Buëch
 Serres
 Laragne-Montéglin
 Alpes-de-Haute-Provence:
 Mison
 Sisteron

References

Rivers of France
Rivers of Drôme
Rivers of Hautes-Alpes
Rivers of Alpes-de-Haute-Provence
Rivers of Provence-Alpes-Côte d'Azur
Rivers of Auvergne-Rhône-Alpes
Braided rivers in France